The 1907 Florida football team represented the University of Florida during the 1907 college football season. The season was Jack Forsythe's second as the head coach of the University of Florida football team. The Orange and Blue lost to the Mercer Bears for the second season in a row, beat the Rollins College Tars in Gainesville, Florida, and tied the Tars on their home field in Winter Park, Florida.  Forsythe's 1907 Florida football team posted an overall record of 4–1–1 in their second varsity season.

Before the season

Only four men from the 1906 team returned. Captain Roy Corbett was also the athletics editor of the Florida Pennant. The team featured newcomer William A. Shands, future state senator and namesake of Shands Hospital.

Schedule

Season summary

Mercer
The season opened with the Mercer Baptists beating Florida 6–0. Sam Jameson, son of Mercer president S. Y. Jameson, sustained a broken collarbone while tackling a Florida player. Mercer scored on a blocked kick.

Columbia

Next, Florida gained a  6–0   upset win over Columbia Agricultural College of Savannah. After a scoreless first half, Roy Corbett ran 65 yards to set up a touchdown run by coach Forsythe. Forsythe also averaged 45 yards per punt. The win led to a parade in the streets.

Rollins

Merchants in Gainesville closed the stores from 3 to 4:30 p. m. to allow their workers to attend a State Championship game. "Grit" Gibbs played with a fever which turned out to be malaria.

Clarence Boyer made a placekick in the first half for Rollins. In the second, Florida got a touchdown on an 8-yard run by Jim Shands and a 35-yard drop kick from Mal Haughton.

Riverside A. C.
Florida beat the Riverside Athletic Club  21–0 in Jacksonville. Forsythe repeatedly ran for gains.

Riverside A. C.
In a rematch, Florida beat the Riverside Athletic Club 17–0 in Gainesville.

Rollins
In a rematch, Florida fought Rollins to a scoreless tie in Winter Park.

Postseason
Both Florida and Stetson claimed state titles.

Notes

References

Bibliography
 
 
 

Florida
Florida Gators football seasons
Florida football